Pervomayskoye, before 1940 - P'yany Rog, is a rural locality (a selo) and the administrative center of Pervomayskoye Rural Settlement, Pochepsky District, Bryansk Oblast, Russia. In the 19th century the village was part of Krasnorogskaya volost, Mglinsky Uyezd, Chernigov Governorate. The population was 881 as of 2010. There are 18 streets.

Geography 
Pervomayskoye is located 12 km southeast of Pochep (the district's administrative centre) by road. Popovka is the nearest rural locality.

References 

Rural localities in Pochepsky District